The 6th Houston Film Critics Society Awards were given out at a ceremony held at the Museum of Fine Arts on January 5, 2013. The nominations were announced on December 15, 2012.

Winners and nominees 
Winners are listed first and highlighted with boldface.

Individual awards

Lifetime Achievement Award 
 Robert Duvall

Humanitarian Award
 Adam Yauch

Outstanding Achievement
 Jeff Millar

Technical Achievement
 The Hobbit: An Unexpected Journey

References

External links 
 Houston Film Critics Society: Awards

2012
2012 film awards
2012 in Texas
Houston